The PNR South Main Line (also known as Southrail and formerly the Main Line South) is one of the two trunk lines that form the Philippine National Railways' network in the island of Luzon, Philippines. It was opened in stages between 1916 and 1938 by the Manila Railroad. Services peaked in the 1940s until the late 1960s, when the system started to decline. Since 1988, it was the only functioning inter-city rail after its counterpart to the north, the North Main Line, was closed. The intercity section of the line in Laguna, Quezon and the Bicol Region was then closed and reopened repeatedly between 2004 and 2014 due to a combination of declining ridership and was closed since then. Currently, only two short sections of the line survive; the PNR Metro Commuter Line between Tutuban station and Laguna, and the Bicol Commuter regional rail service between Sipocot and Naga, Camarines Sur.

Since its closure, there has been a planned overhaul of the line. The railway will consist of two standard-gauge lines which will overlap in southern Metro Manila and Laguna. One is the North–South Commuter Railway's South section between Tutuban and Solis stations in north-central Metro Manila to Calamba station in Calamba, Laguna. This route will be electrified with direct current power through overhead lines. The other is the PNR South Long Haul from Sucat station in Muntinlupa to Matnog station in Matnog, Sorsogon.

History

Planning of the Luzon network started in 1875. To the south of Manila would be a line leading to Legazpi, Albay and a branch line leading to Bauan, Batangas.

Pre-PNR era

Some parts of what will become the South Main Line were first constructed in 1903 as part of the Antipolo Line to Rizal under the virtue of Insular Government Act No. 703. The formal construction of a main line to the south of Tutuban station began in 1909 by the virtue of Act No. 1905. By 1909, there was already a line between Tutuban and Naic, Cavite. This was known as the Naic line. Another line was also opened from Calamba, Laguna to Bauan via Batangas City. More lines were constructed into the 1910s including the lines from Nueva Cáceres, Ambos Camarines to Legazpi or Tabaco, Albay as the Legazpi Division, the Pagsanjan branch line and the extension of the Antipolo line to Montalban. Between 1916 and 1919, a new line to Tayabas province was opened and was named the Main Line South and had branch lines covering all provinces in the Southern Tagalog region.

The first intercity service on the new Main Line South was the first Bicol Express, which originally only stopped at Aloneros station in Guinayangan, Quezon between 1916 and 1919. The Main Line South was connected to the Legazpi Division by a fleet of train ferries between Quezon and Camarines Sur. This ferry service became increasingly redundant as the last rail connecting Manila to Bicol was laid on November 17, 1937.

The second Bicol Express, which at that point had been running the full length of the new Main Line South to Legazpi, was inaugurated on January 31, 1938 and became a regular service by May 8 of the same year. On the same day, the golden spike was struck by then-president Manuel L. Quezon at Del Gallego, Camarines Sur. Meanwhile, services on the Naic line and the Tabaco branch were cut and the tracks were dismantled later that year.

Services on the new line peaked for a brief period between 1938 and 1941, and were regarded as one of the most profitable eras for the Manila Railroad. However, most of the rail infrastructure was destroyed by World War II when the United States fought against the Empire of Japan in 1941 and 1944-45. Rehabilitation of the network cost the Manila Railroad ₱20 million (convertible to US$115 million in 2020) and by the late 1950s, most of the network had been restored. More branch lines were cut including the Pagsanjan and Antipolo branches. On August 12, 1956, the Manila Railroad was one of the first in Asia to fully retire its steam locomotive fleet and adopt dieselization.

PNR era
The Manila Railroad was reorganized into the Philippine National Railways in 1964 by the virtue of Republic Act 4156. The early days of PNR during the 1960s and the early 1970s were also considered by the agency as its best. During this period, there were already proposed extensions of the South Main Line to Sorsogon province enacted by Republic Act 6366. However, increasing maintenance costs, natural disasters and competition from highways prevented the PNR from expanding, and eventually caused the eventual decline of the entire system.

Decline and contemporary history
The latter years of the 1970s were increasingly burdensome to the PNR as natural disasters and increasing maintenance costs, as well as stiff competition with the national highway network started the decline of PNR as a whole. By 1988, only the South Main Line remained as the sole intercity line, although commuter trains on the North Main Line continued to run to Malolos station until 1997. Since then, services further dwindled until only a small section of the line between Tutuban and Santa Rosa stations remained active by 2014 as the rest of the line was closed. That plan however was not pursued. Operations resumed on July 23, 2015 from Tutuban to Alabang.

In May 2019, the agency was investigated after piles of railroad ties were found in the front yard of Muntinlupa station. These ties were meant for the rehabilitation of the line near Hondagua station in Quezon. It is a request stop in front of the International Rice Research Institute headquarters in Los Baños.

During the enhanced community quarantine in Luzon, the intercity section was temporarily reactivated for PNR's Hatid Probinsya program in June 2020. So-called "locally-stranded individuals", or people who wished to return to their hometowns amidst the lockdown, were returned to Bicol via so-called LSI trains . This is part of the larger Balik Probinsya program by the national government to decongest Metro Manila and develop the countryside regions of the Philippines both during and after the COVID-19 pandemic. The fifth and last known service was on August 29, 2020. The line was once again closed after the program ended.

On February 14, 2022, Valentine's Day, a regional rail service between San Pablo, Laguna and Lucena, Quezon made its first run. On June 25, President Rodrigo Duterte inaugurated the Inter-Provincial Commuter service, with operations commencing the following day.

Station list 

There are currently 47 stations being used on the South Main Line, 31 of these are for the Metro South Commuter line, 6 stations for the Inter-Provincial Commuter line, and 10 for the Bicol Commuter service. It previously served all provinces in Calabarzon, as well as Camarines Sur and Albay. Currently, only sections in Metro Manila, Laguna, Quezon, and Camarines Sur are served.

Services

Active
There are three operable sections of the South Main Line, the Metro Commuter Line, the Inter-Provincial Commuter line and the Bicol Commuter service. The Metro Commuter Line operates two services, the Metro South Commuter and the Shuttle Service.
There were also named services to Guadalupe station in Mandaluyong and Carmona station in Carmona, Cavite. These were named after indigenous flora.
The Bicol Commuter is a  local train service in the Bicol Region, particularly in the province of Camarines Sur. There was a proposal to extend the service to  after all 900 class locomotives and ex-JNR rolling stock has been refurbished, as only the newer Korean and Indonesian rolling stock will remain in Metro Manila. This plan is yet to be realized.
The Inter-Provincial Commuter is a  commuter and regional rail service from San Pablo or Calamba, Laguna to Lucena, Quezon. It has been proposed as part of the PNR South Long Haul project in 2019. The service made its first trial run on February 14, 2022, and was reopened on June 26.

Defunct
In 2006, regular intercity operations on the South Main Line were indefinitely suspended. Issues such as rail metal theft and natural disasters have hampered the line's intercity service from operating regularly ever since. Illegal settlers also live close to the rails in Metro Manila and Laguna sections of the line. In Camarines Sur, liquefaction of the track's embankment caused a section of the line in Sipocot to sink. This forced the inaugural service of the new Bicol Express in 2011 to slow down to a near stop while passing through the area. On September 21, 2019, a KiHa 59 and a rerailment train consisting of a newly-repainted PNR 900 class locomotive and a CMC coach conducted a test run from Tutuban to Naga.

Bicol Express 

The Bicol Express was the primary service on the South Main Line. The service started operations between Manila and Aloneros station in Guinayangan, Quezon by 1919 along with the Lucena Express. A separate train between Pamplona and Tabaco, and between Port Ragay and Legazpi was opened by 1933. The Tabaco branch line during this era was closed in 1937 and instead, they linked these three sections into a single line. This formed the backbone of the South Main Line and was subsequently opened in 1938. This service was short lived and ended during the Japanese occupation of the Philippines in 1942. During this era, the Japanese government focused on rebuilding the North Main Line instead and extended it to Sudipen on the border between Ilocos Sur and La Union, and the south line's rehabilitation was cut to San Pablo, Laguna.

After the line's post-war rehabilitation, another service was opened. The service immediately became popular with the public and more services were introduced on August 16, 1954.

There were two services of this type: the daytime Bicol Express and the Night Express which was the night train counterpart. The Bicol Express leaving Manila was numbered 511 and its night counterpart leaving Legazpi was numbered 513. The Bicol Express leaving Legazpi was numbered 512 and the Night Express leaving Manila was numbered 514. The trains only stopped at six stations between Tutuban and Legazpi: Paco, Lucena, Tagkawayan, Sipocot, Naga and Ligao. Journey times lasted 13 hours between the two termini. Services were expanded until the 1970s.

By 1998, Bicol Express was the only intercity service on the South Main Line. More stations were also added to the line. It was renumbered as Train T-611 for the southbound (MA-NG) and Train T-612 for the northbound (NG-MA). Another Bicol Express train was serviced by the second version of the General Manager's train, a trainset based on modified CMC-300 series DMUs already operating in PNR service. This was numbered T-577.

Since then, the service was discontinued by 2006 after natural disasters inflicted serious damage to the tracks and bridges. Efforts to revive the service were unsuccessful. Since 2014, operations to the Bicol Region have been suspended. This is primarily because of typhoon damage to bridges. The PNR hoped to reopen the Bicol Express Service by about September 2014. Due to the damages brought by the Typhoon Rammasun (locally named Glenda), PNR announced that the Bicol Express' resumption of services would be further delayed until October and November 2014. Since then resumption of service has been repeatedly announced and then cancelled, most recently in late 2016. This was mostly because of the remoteness of the areas and the necessity of more extensive railway repairs, which has rendered the railways towards Tutuban and back impassable until very recently.

The return of train services to Bicol is planned with the construction of the South Long Haul project.

Lucena Express 
The Lucena Express was first opened in 1916 with a service between Malvar, Batangas and Aloneros in Guinayangan, Quezon. Later, the service was opened between Manila and Lucena. This train stopped at Blumentritt (San Lazaro), Santa Mesa, Paco, San Pedro, Biñan, Santa Rosa, Calamba, Los Baños, College, Masaya, San Pablo, Tiaong, Taguan, Candelaria, Lutucan and Sariaya stations. It was discontinued in 1942 during the Japanese occupation and was later integrated with the Bicol Express after the war.

Mayon Limited 
The older Mayon Express Limited service was hauled by the newly-acquired MCBP class DMUs starting in 1973.

In March 2012, the Mayon Limited was resurrected and ran between Tutuban and Ligao. The train ran as Mayon DeLuxe on Monday, Wednesday and Friday from Tutuban as train T-713 with three air-conditioned carriages with reclining seats. The train returned on Tuesday, Thursday and Sunday as train T-714 from Ligao. On Tuesdays, Thursdays and Sundays the train ran as Ordinary train (T-815) with non-reclining seats and cooling by fan. The departures for train T-816 were scheduled every Monday, Wednesday and Friday. The train did not run on Saturdays. The trains meet at Gumaca.

Two types of DMUs were used for the service. The ordinary Mayon Limited services used KiHa 52 DMUs. Meanwhile the Mayon Limited Deluxe used the KiHa 59 series DMUs, still with its original Kogane livery.

As of September 2013, all operations to the Bicol Region, including the Mayon Limited, have been suspended.

Manila Limited 
The Manila Limited was a train service between Manila and Iriga. One train each left from these two termini. Train 517 left Manila by 3 pm and arrived in Iriga by 4:15 am. Train 518 left Iriga by 2:50 pm and arrived in Manila by 2:35 am. It ended in 2006 when all regular intercity services were terminated.

Prestige Express 
The Prestige Express, also nicknamed the VIP Train from some rail enthusiasts of the time, was a limited express service from 1974 to 1981. It ran the full length of the South Main Line, but only stopped at only five stations in between. In Manila, it only stopped at the historic Paco station. Afterwards, it stopped at Lucena in Quezon, Naga in Camarines Sur, and in Daraga and Ligao in Albay. Like all services on the South Main Line, there were more stations added. The service was replaced by the shorter Peñafrancia Express in 1981 that ended at Naga.

The service used JMC-319 Luster, later MC-6366 Nikkō. It was a JMC class diesel multiple unit built by Tokyu Car Company in 1955 and refurbished in 1973 with a streamlined cab inspired by the likes of the 0 Series Shinkansen. PNR later removed the streamlined cone from the unit after an accident and the trainset was placed into service to serve the Bicol Express from 1998 to 2004. Since then, it has been withdrawn from passenger service and was relegated to track maintenance as inspection car IC-888. Although inactive and stripped of its motive power, there are no plans for the unit to be scrapped.

Peñafrancia Express 
The PNR inaugurated the Peñafrancia Express between Manila and Naga City in 1981. It became PNR's premium intercity service and also had airline-style features such as pre-recorded background music, snacks, caterers, and stewardesses. Unlike the preceding Prestige Express, it did not have specialized rolling stock. It was primarily a choice between the acquired refurbished Nikko train acquired from the previous Prestige service, and later the 900 class locomotive and hauled ICF baggage cars and sleeper coaches built in Madras (now Chennai), India.

Initially they were non-stop between Paco Station in Manila and Naga City, save for when the Peñafrancia Express trains headed in opposite directions and had to cross each other along the route in Quezon province. Later on, additional stops were added, mostly in the Bicol province of Camarines Sur with the train stopping in towns like Ragay, Sipocot, and Libmanan. This service ended by the late 1990s.

Rolling stock

All locomotives, coaches and multiple units in active service with the PNR are being used on the South Main Line. This is because almost all PNR operations happen here on Metro South Commuter, Shuttle Service, Inter-Provincial Commuter, and Bicol Commuter services.

As of 2022, the line uses diesel locomotives and multiple units, as well as passenger coaches built for the  Cape gauge. Its diesel locomotive fleet are predominantly GE Universal Series locomotives built between 1973 and 1992 by GE Transportation, the exception being 3 INKA CC300s which entered service in 2021. These are the 900, 2500 and 5000 classes. Not all GE locomotives are operational due to either being scrapped, destroyed during accidents or stored for rehabilitation.

Meanwhile, its multiple units and coaches are all built by Asian manufacturers. There are three distinct generations of active railcars:
There are 18 PNR Hyundai Rotem DMU railcars, built by Korean firm Hyundai Rotem in 2009 and entered service the same year. Although built new in 2009, they had a longer service in PNR compared to ex-JR rolling stock as they were only acquired in the early 2010s. Not all sets are operational.
The ex-JNR rolling stock such as the KiHa 35 and 59 DMUs, and the 203 series electric multiple units converted into locomotive-hauled cars. These were originally built in the 1960s and the 1980s and were handed over by JR East to the PNR between 2011 and 2015. The KiHa 52 sets are inactive as of 2020.
The newest trains in PNR service are 37 railcars built by Industri Kereta Api (PT INKA) between 2018 and 2020. These include the 8000 class and 8100 class DMUs and the 8300 class coaches, all based on the INKA K3 coach design. The 8000 class and 8100 class DMUs entered service in 2019 and 2020, respectively, while the 8300 class coaches entered service in January 2021.

Reconstruction

The South Main Line will be reconstructed under the PNR South railways program that is part of the new Luzon Rail System (PNR Luzon). PNR Luzon is the proposed network of rail lines to be built on the island of Luzon. Two new lines that will use the South Main Line's right of way will be constructed. Another is the South Long Haul project which will connect southern Metro Manila with the Bicol Region.

NSCR South

A  section of the South Main Line, currently used for the Metro Commuter service, will be reconstructed as part of the North–South Commuter Railway.

NSCR is an S-train-style urban rail transit system. It incorporates elements of commuter rail in terms of distance covered and higher maximum speed, as well as elements of rapid transit in terms of service frequency, right-of-way separated, rolling stock with longitudinal seating, and use of half-height platform screen doors. Limited-stop Commuter express services will use the same rolling stock as the regular commuter service but will stop at fewer stations. Finally, an Airport express service will enjoy the highest priority and will have its dedicated rolling stock being a limited express service.

A total of 464 electric multiple unit trainsets have been procured to operate on the line. 104 of these are 8-car EM10000 class trainsets that are based on JR East commuter stock such as the E233 series to be built by the Japan Transport Engineering Company (J-TREC). Another 404 commuter train cars will be built by J-TREC. As of 2022, the airport express trains are in the process of being procured. The airport express trains will also be made by Japanese manufacturers.

There are also plans for the line to be extended to Batangas City to the south once the line itself achieves successful operations. This will occupy the old right-of-way of the Bauan line. The Batangas extension will be a different development from the South Long Haul as the two lines will not overlap, even in Metro Manila.

South Long Haul

The South Long Haul project, also known as PNR Bicol, is a planned rebuild of the intercity line between Metro Manila and the Bicol Region. The line will be initially built as a single-track system. However, there are provisions for an upgrade to double-track or electrification in the future. Stations will be allowed to use passing sidings so that express train travel is uninterrupted.

The South Long Haul line in its present form will be built between Sucat in Muntinlupa, southern Metro Manila, and Matnog station in Matnog, Sorsogon at the southeasternmost tip of Luzon. There will be two branch lines with the first is the Batangas branch. The branch will split between Los Baños and San Pablo stations in Laguna and will head towards the direction of Lipa, Batangas and will follow a new right-of-way, ending at Batangas International Port in Batangas City. The second branch will be the Legazpi line. It will be built from the new Daraga station located outside the poblacion of Daraga at which Phase 1 terminates, and will lead the existing right of way to Legazpi station in Legazpi, Albay.

The system can handle up to 100,000 passengers per day, thirteen times more than PNR's peak ridership of 7,560 daily passengers on the old South Main Line in the 1960s and early 1970s. To accommodate this many passengers, 64 passenger railcars were procured by the PNR in 2021. This would be arranged into 8-car trainsets similar to the NSCR, but are expected to be diesel stock due to the aforementioned lack of electrification on the line. This replaced a previous order of 9 diesel multiple unit cars from CRRC Zhuzhou Locomotive, which would have been arranged into 3-car trainsets. Diesel locomotives are also expected to be used as freight trains connecting various ports and inland facilities.

Newer narrow-gauge rolling stock are expected to remain in service due to them being the most recent stock in the PNR fleet. The only publicly-available information was about its purpose being primarily for freight transport. For passenger services, it will also serve as a transport redundancy for the NSCR. Plans for a workaround with existing rolling stock are yet to be announced.

Footnotes

References

External links
PNR South Long Haul Alignment (Phase 1) — Alignment and station layout information for the South Long Haul are taken from this site.

Philippine National Railways
tl:Pangunahing Linyang Patimog ng PNR
ja:フィリピン国鉄南方本線